is a video game developer housed within the Japanese video game company Sega as part of its  division. It is known for developing the games in the Like a Dragon series, which the studio is named after, since Yakuza 5.

The studio's origins can be traced back to Sega AM11 in 1998, which was renamed to R&D4 or AM4 in 1999. It was headed by Toshihiro Nagoshi who joined Sega AM2 in 1989 and has been credited as the creator of the arcade titles Daytona USA and Virtua Striker. He requested his own development division during the development of Shenmue.

In 2000, AM4 was reestablished as Amusement Vision, where it was best known for Super Monkey Ball and F-Zero GX. Several structural changes occurred in the years that followed. During a reorganization in 2003, the non-sports staff of Smilebit merged with Amusement Vision, and a year later Sega merged with Sammy to form Sega Sammy Holdings. Amusement Vision became New Entertainment R&D Dept. and the first Like a Dragon game was released. Ryū ga Gotoku Kenzan! was the last Like a Dragon game to be developed under the New Entertainment R&D name.

Since Yakuza 3, they were referred to as Sega's CS1 team, all the way up to Yakuza: Dead Souls. The first game to use the RGG logo was Binary Domain in Japan, released in February 2012. Eventually, the RGG Studio's logo became used consistently and the way they brand themselves and give themselves an identity of their own.

According to studio head Masayoshi Yokoyama, the studio is not a company organization but rather a "concept" or a "production team". Nevertheless, the studio's logo and name have become more recognizable internationally, and the logo has been used consistently.

History

Amusement Vision 

Toshihiro Nagoshi joined Sega in 1989 as a designer. As Sega began developing 3D games such as Virtua Racing, he was able to apply his knowledge of film in choosing the right camera angles in three dimensional spaces, something that the other team members had no experience with. Nagoshi became producer, director and chief designer of Daytona USA, which became one of the most successful arcade games of all time. Next he worked on another racing game, Scud Race, which, while successful, did not make as much money as Daytona USA. Nagoshi felt pressure to constantly deliver racing games as he became known for the genre in the company. He developed SpikeOut, which he described as a "personal rebellion" as it was a character based action game where players could play for a long time with just one credit, though profits for arcade operators suffered. Nagoshi requested his own development division during the development of Shenmue.

In what has been called "a brief moment of remarkable creativity", in 2000, Sega restructured its arcade and console development teams into nine semi-autonomous studios headed by the company's top creators. In 2000, Toshihiro Nagoshi was the president of AV (Amusement Vision). Nagoshi chose the name because he was fond of the term 'vision', and amusement was the core market of the studio. AV refers to Adult Video in Japan, however Nagoshi thinks with all adult videos being streamed in the future, people will instead think of amusement video when they see AV. Speaking about initial plans for AV, Nagoshi wanted to make original titles in addition to sequels. He also was not fond of doing ports of arcade titles, believing console and arcade titles should be developed separately and in mind for their target market. Of the nine studios that Sega established, AV was the smallest, with about 50 employees.

Nagoshi devised the concept of rolling spheres through mazes based on his desire to create a game that was instantly possible to understand and play, as a contrast to increasingly complex games at Japanese arcades at the time. Another desire for developing the game was to prove that games can be successful without a huge budget, which was a particular complaint from Sega's CEO at the time.

AV developed it initially as an arcade title, Monkey Ball. Monkey Ball was first released in Japanese arcades in June 2001, and then received an upgraded version — Super Monkey Ball — as a GameCube launch title in all regions. After the success of the first Super Monkey Ball, it spawned a direct sequel on the GameCube. Following that, a collaboration with Nintendo happened. AV would develop F-Zero GX in a contracted development, while Nintendo would be responsible for the supervision, production and publishing of their IP. In the end, Nintendo was impressed with the product, considering it a step forward for the F-Zero franchise.

Amusement Vision consistently produced high selling titles and was profitable in its second year of operation. Nagoshi was promoted within Sega along with Yuji Naka and Hisao Oguchi who also ran profitable studios in the form of Naka's Sonic Team and Oguchi's Hitmaker. When Oguchi became company president in 2003,  he announced his intention to consolidate Sega's studios into "four or five core operations". As part of the consolidation, the non-sports staff of Smilebit, developers of games like  Jet Set Radio Future and Panzer Dragoon Orta on Xbox, were absorbed by  Amusement Vision. Smilebit was considered to be less commercially successful than AV and also focused more on the console market, but had high technical skills. Nagoshi had to think about how to use everyone's skill to the best of their ability. When the idea of a game portraying the Japanese underworld came about from Nagoshi, Masayoshi Kikuchi who previously worked on the Jet Set Radio series at Smilebit, agreed to the concept. Coincidentally both were watching yakuza type movies and had a desire to turn that type of atmosphere into a game. By 2004, AV had about 124 employees.

Development of Yakuza / Like a Dragon and building a franchise 
By July 2005, Amusement Vision was renamed to New Entertainment R&D Dept., and the development of Yakuza was progressing. The first Like a Dragon game had a difficult development cycle, as the first pitch was rejected by the higher-ups, due to expecting something different out of Nagoshi. At the time, Sega and Sammy merged to form Sega Sammy Holdings. The new owner and CEO of Sega Sammy, Hajime Satomi saw footage of Like a Dragon that was forcibly sneaked in a preview of upcoming Sega games, in spite of that it wasn't officially a project yet. Satomi took an interest in it, though the Sega executives were unhappy about this move. Through perseverance however, Nagoshi managed to get the project started.

The project was risky as there was no estimate on how the market would accept a game aimed at only adult Japanese males, based in the Japanese underworld. The highest estimate was only 70,000 copies in Japan. However, over time, the game sold over 1 million copies. Nagoshi said that it gave the team confidence to press on and continue to evolve it into a series. The staff from Amusement Vision and Smilebit worked on many different console and arcade games, and they had confidence in their genres and careers. However, Like a Dragon did not match any of their past experiences, which Nagoshi saw as them all playing on a level playing field. Every element of the game had to go through Nagoshi first, because only he had a concrete idea of how the game was supposed to end up. However, some staff did not like the uncertain nature and overall pressure of the project, and ended up quitting. When the game grew into a franchise, the staff gained more freedom and independence in regards to which elements to put into the game, due to established rules by Nagoshi. Therefore, the games became more varied as the series went on. The initial target audience was adult Japanese males but overtime, the series audience expanded into females and also overseas players, though the primary target audience still remains the adult Japanese males.

Nagoshi says that the development team of the Like a Dragon series always needs to have a sense of challenge. For Yakuza 2, they first thought about having a two-year development cycle, but after discussion, it was thought that releasing and developing the game just one year later would be better to keep audiences attention, though it meant more work for them. For the first spin-off Ryū ga Gotoku Kenzan!, the team initially made fun of their goal of making the game for the new PlayStation 3 while also moving to a different setting. However, they managed to make it in just a year and a bit, and the staff felt refreshed. The team held seminars in Japan explaining how to develop an HD game in 10 months.

While certain things have become routine, each game is still hard work for the team, but the fanbase keeps Nagoshi motivated. Nagoshi explains that the fast release schedule of one game per year with a massive amount of content is based on the team's desire to constantly keep delivering the fans with not just what they want, but also to surprise them.

Yakuza 0 increased the fanbase internationally. Previous localized installments did not always meet expectations in terms of sales. Yakuza 0, being a prequel, made it an easy jumping-in point for new fans as well as the expertise of recently merged Atlus USA, were factors in its success. This also led to the previous games getting remasters and remakes in the form of the two remakes Yakuza Kiwami and Yakuza Kiwami 2 and remasters of Yakuza 3, Yakuza 4 and Yakuza 5. Producer Daisuke Sato wanted to continue to do titles that are well accepted globally, not only limited to Japan and niche consumers.

In October 2021, Sega announced that Nagoshi and Daisuke Sato were leaving the company after decades working in it. Due to this, series producer and writer Masayoshi Yokoyama would become the new studio head in place of Nagoshi who was in the position since the beginning. With the shift in leadership, the studio confirmed they were working on a sequel to Yakuza: Like a Dragon.

Writing 
The main writer behind the stories and scenarios of most of the Like a Dragon series has been Masayoshi Yokoyama, who previously was a senior planner for Jet Set Radio and director of Ollie King. When developing the first game, the tagline was "The maddog Yakuza and the 10 billion yen girl" and various members of the team were able to pitch a story. Yokoyama's proposal stood out where instead of focusing on a big plot twist that concerned the girl and the 10 billion yen, he drew up a character correlation chart, and explained how the various characters were related to each other. As a whole, Yokoyama focuses on entertaining characters and scenes, and only decides the culprit at the very end in the writing process, with a focus on who would be the most interesting to fight as a final boss. Yokoyama himself doesn't read novels and has no training in script writing, and is mostly inspired by visual mediums like film and TV shows. For the first two Like a Dragon games, crime novelist Hase Seishu was an editor of Yokoyama's scripts. He heavily critiqued the first draft, suggesting that it lacks realism, so Yokoyama did further research and adjusted the script in his own way. For the second game, Yokoyama only needed one round of editing from Seishu. Nagoshi is very involved in the creation of the scripts, and advocated for the various elements found in Yakuza 3, such as the more heartwarming atmosphere with the kids at the orphanage, the return of Joji Kazama, as well as suggesting the keywords "base" and "defense" for the story. For Yakuza 2, the golden Osaka Castle, was also Nagoshi's idea.

Other projects 
One detour for the team was the game Binary Domain, which unlike the Like a Dragon series, was an attempt to make something for the worldwide audience. However, it was a commercial failure, only selling 20,000 copies in North America by April 2012. It made the team reflect on preferring to keep making authentic Japanese games rather than pretending to be something else. The new Dragon Engine developed for Yakuza 6 and used in subsequent games used technology from Binary Domain and was evolved further. The Dragon Engine was also lent to Virtua Fighter 5: Ultimate Showdown, which was co-developed with Sega AM2.

Nagoshi said that for the Super Monkey Ball series, he put the wheels in motion at the very beginning, but eventually, other staff continued where he left off when subsequent games got made. Talks of bringing back the Super Monkey Ball IP with a remaster for current hardware were happening, but nothing came into fruition, due to struggling to get the right team of people. Masao Shirosaki was pondering what to work on next after finishing development on Judgment, and as Shirosaki and some staff became available, the project officially began. Shirosaki revealed that Banana Blitz specifically was chosen for a remaster, because with the limited time and budget they had, it was the most reasonable choice. However, he stated that if successful, remakes of 1 and 2, as well as a new game would be possible. While there was initially no official word from Sega on how Banana Blitz HD performed, a remake of the first 3 Super Monkey Ball games, Super Monkey Ball Banana Mania that takes the series back to its origins, had ultimately come into fruition. Shirosaki later revealed in a September 2021 interview that Banana Blitz HD did actually receive a lot of support from the fans. The RGG Studio branding was not used in Asian regions of the game.

CS1 moved on to mobile games with Ryu Ga Gotoku Mobile released for GREE and Kingdom Conquest for iOS. The team that handled these mobile games formed a new team and left CS1 to establish a new division exclusively dedicated to these mobile games, due to the growth of mobile games and the release of internet enabled PlayStation Vita. It is headed by Like a Dragon producer Masayoshi Kikuchi, thus effectively leaving the studio with his last credit being Yakuza 5.

Games developed

Marketing
The RGG Studio logo was established in late August 2011, and was first used to promote Binary Domain in Japan back in February 2012.

See also
 List of Sega video games
 Sega development studios
 Sega AM1
 Sega AM2
 Sega AM3
 Smilebit
 Sonic Team
 United Game Artists

Notes

References

Video game companies of Japan
Video game companies established in 2011
Japanese companies established in 2011
Sega divisions and subsidiaries
Video game development companies